Guglielmo Franchetti or Gino Franchetti (born 5 October 1985) is former motorcycle speedway rider from Italy.

Career
Franchetti was a member of Italy national speedway team and was twice Italian National Champion in 2009 and 2012.

He rode in the British leagues for Berwick Bandits during the 2008 Premier League speedway season and 2009 Premier League speedway season. He then rode for the Plymouth Devils in 2011 and 2012.

Honours

World Championships 
 Team World Championship (Speedway World Cup)
 2006 - 4th place in Qualifying round 2 (3 points)
 2007 - 4th place in Qualifying round 2 (8 points)
 2009 - 3rd place in Qualifying round 1 (7 points)
 2010 - 4th place in Qualifying round 2 (7 points)

European Championships 
 Individual European Championship
 2007 - 14th place in Semi-Final A (4 points)
 2009 - 12th place in Qualifying Round 3
 European Pairs Championship
 2004 - 7th place in Semi-Final 1 (2 points)
 2007 -  Terenzano - 7th place (3 points)
 2009 - 3rd place in Semi-Final
 European Club Champions' Cup
 2007 - 2nd place in Semi-Final 1 (8 points)

Italian Championships 
 2009 Italian Speedway Championship' - 1st place
 2012 Italian Speedway Championship' - 1st place

See also 
 Italy national speedway team
 Speedway Grand Prix of Italy

References 

1985 births
Living people
Italian speedway riders
Berwick Bandits riders
Plymouth Devils riders